Minar-i Chakari is a pillar made of carved stones on an elevation of 16 kilometers southeast of Kabul in Afghanistan . It is 28.5 meters high and is one of Buddhist buildings which at the time of the Kushan Empire was built in the area of Kabultals. Minar-i Chakari was built in the 1st century AD. and was heavily damaged during the Afghan Civil war. In 1988 it was subsequently destroyed by the hardline Taliban regime.

Location 
Minar-i Chakari is located directly on the northern slope of the Shakh Baranta ridge and continues to go 600 meters to the plain of Kabul. The city can be seen from above and the snow-capped mountains of the Hindu Kush in the background. To the south there is a plateau up to another mountain range with peaks of over 3000 meters. The pillar lays widely on an old trade and tour route, the closest connection to the regional capital of the Greek-Bactrian empire of Alexandria on the Caucasus. It is 65 kilometres north of Kabul, and from the southeast, it goes towards Jalalabad heading towards India. Under the rule of the Kushanas, the Greek province (satrapy) Paropanisadai was renamed Kabulistan and the provincial administration was moved to Kabul. During the reign of King Vima Kadphises , from around 100 AD, the empire began to expand into India and the economic had a magnificent growth, which was reflected in the construction of Buddhist monuments and monasteries around the capital. This also included the construction of two Buddhist pillars ( Sanskrit Stambha ) in the south of the city: the 19 meter high Surkh Minar ("red tower"), which collapsed in an earthquake in spring 1965, and the Minareh Syah, which is closer to and at the foot of the mountain ("Black tower") on the mountain, which was named Minar-i Chakari in the 19th century.

Discovery and investigations 
Minar-i Chakri was first found on its way into Western antiquity through British soldiers who were exploring the country in the 19th century.  In 1841 Charles Masson published a detailed report and the drawing about a "Greek monument" in London. However with the withdrawal of the British Army at the end of the First Anglo-Afghan War  some of the survivors reported about a pillar they had seen.

References 

Buddhist buildings
Archaeological sites in Afghanistan
Archaeological sites in Asia
Monumental columns